The Big Record is an American television music variety series which aired from September 18, 1957, to 1958 on CBS. Originally it was an hour-long show (approx. 50 minutes excluding ads) but later was a half-hour show (approx. 25 minutes excluding ads). It was hosted by Patti Page, who sang songs and introduced the guest performers. Most of the music was of the pop genre, although other styles of music were also featured, including jazz, rock and roll, and (rarely) country. Professional dancers also sometimes appeared as guests.

In one episode (March 12 1958), the guests included Pearl Bailey, Hilo Hattie, The Four Voices and Florence Henderson. There were 26 hour-long episodes and 12 half-hour episodes. The series aired live, and kinescoped for west coast broadcast. It was one of the few CBS programs of the 1950s broadcast in color (during an era when arch-rival NBC was regarded as the leader in color telecasts). In the May 21 1958 episode, guest singer Jo Stafford mentioned the series being broadcast from New York City, and made a topical joke (regarding the baseball Giants and Dodgers relocating to California): "look at it this way, you haven't lost a ball team, you've gained a parking lot."

The Oldsmobile division of General Motors was the main sponsor, and some of the commercials featured Patti Page singing the Oldsmobile jingle. Florence Henderson appeared in some of the filmed ads for the cars. Due to the kinescope technology used to record the shows, a number of episodes with commercials intact still exist. Following the end of the series, Page hosted an additional series for Oldsmobile during the 1958–1959 television season (The Patti Page Oldsmobile Show).

Reception
Reviewing an episode, Billboard felt the series needed a more precise format, but also complimented Page's hosting and singing.

References

External links

The series was not registered with the U.S. copyright office. Four and a half episodes appear on the Internet Archive: November 27 1957, April 23 1958, May 14 1958, May 21 1958 and the first half of February 5 1958

1957 American television series debuts
1958 American television series endings
1950s American variety television series
CBS original programming
Black-and-white American television shows
English-language television shows
Pop music television series